Ezra Butler (September 24, 1763July 12, 1838) was an American clergyman, politician, lawyer, judge, the 11th governor of Vermont, and a United States representative from Vermont.

Biography
Butler was born in Lancaster in the Province of Massachusetts Bay. In 1770 he moved with his parents to West Windsor, Vermont. His mother died while he was still a boy, and, after living with his elder brother for several years, he engaged in agricultural pursuits in Claremont, New Hampshire, until he was an adult. He served in the Continental Army for six months in 1779 during the American Revolution.

Career
In 1775 Butler staked a claim as the second settler in Waterbury, Vermont.  He returned in 1776 with his wife, Tryphena Diggins, with whom he eventually had eleven children.

In 1785, Butler studied law in Waterbury, Vermont, and after he passed the bar, in 1786, he practiced law, and served as Town Clerk in 1790. In 1790, he began to think seriously on religious subjects, became a Baptist in 1791, and in 1800 began to preach at Bolton, Vermont. A Baptist church was organized in Waterbury in 1800, and he was its pastor for more than thirty years. He did not allow his ordination to the ministry to interfere with his public career.

Butler was one of the first three selectmen of Waterbury. He was elected member of the Vermont House of Representatives, an office he held from 1794 to 1797; from 1799 to 1804; in 1807; and in 1808. He was the first judge of the Chittenden County Court  from 1803 to 1806; Chief Justice in Chittenden County from 1806 to 1811; and Chief Justice of Jefferson County from 1812 to 1825 (excepting periods of congressional service). He was elected as a Democratic-Republican to the Thirteenth Congress and a member of the State Constitutional Convention in 1822.

Butler was elected as a National Republican Governor of Vermont from 1826 to 1828. During his tenure, lotteries were abolished, and legislation was passed to require the examination of teachers.

In the 1832 election for President, Vermont was carried by Anti-Masonic Party candidate William Wirt.  Butler was one of Vermont's electors, and cast his vote for Wirt.

Death
Butler died in Waterbury on July 12, 1838, and is interred at Waterbury Cemetery.

References

External links

Central Vermont Chamber of Commerce
National Governors Association
The Political Graveyard

1763 births
1838 deaths
People from Lancaster, Massachusetts
Vermont National Republicans
Anti-Masonic Party politicians from Vermont
Governors of Vermont
Members of the Vermont House of Representatives
People from Waterbury, Vermont
Vermont state court judges
People of Vermont in the American Revolution
People of colonial Massachusetts
Continental Army soldiers
Burials in Vermont
Democratic-Republican Party members of the United States House of Representatives from Vermont
National Republican Party state governors of the United States
People from West Windsor, Vermont